The 2012–13 Dempo S.C. season was the club's 45th season since their formation in 1967 and their 15th season ever in the I-League, India's top football league.

Background

Transfers

In:

Out:

Note: Flags indicate national team as has been defined under FIFA eligibility rules. Players may hold more than one non-FIFA nationality.

Federation Cup

Dempo began their season by participating in the 2012 Indian Federation Cup and the club was placed in Group A alongside Pailan Arrows, Mumbai, and Shillong Lajong. Dempo began their Federation Cup campaign with a draw against Pailan Arrows on 19 September 2012 with Clifford Miranda scoring the equalizer for Dempo after Holicharan Narzary scored the first goal of the match for Pailan in the 52nd minute. Dempo then won their first match of the tournament when they defeated Shillong Lajong F.C. by a score of 1–0 with Clifford Miranda again being the scorer for the club in the 45th minute right before half-time. Dempo then confirmed their place into the semi-finals of the Federation Cup in style on 23 September 2012 against Mumbai F.C. with a 4–0 victory over the Maharashtra club with Clifford Miranda scoring his third goal of the tournament in the 23rd minute before Nigerian Koko Sakibo scored a hat-trick with goals coming in the 43rd, 79th, and 90th minutes of the game.

In the semi-finals Dempo took on Salgaocar F.C. in Siliguri on 28 December 2012 and won the match 2–0 with goals from Joaquim Abranches in the 70th and Koko Sakibo in the 84th minute as Dempo booked their place in the Final. Then in the final Dempo lost to East Bengal F.C. 3–2 after Climax Lawrence gave Dempo the 51st-minute lead before East Bengal scored three through Arnab Mondal, Manandeep Singh, and Chidi Edeh in the 60th, 100th, and 109th minute respectively and Mahesh Gawli scored the consolation for Dempo in the 111th minute.

I-League

Dempo then began their 2012–13 I-League season as the defending champions on 6 October 2012 against Churchill Brothers S.C. at the Fatorda Stadium in Margao, Goa in which Dempo won the match 2–1 with their goals coming from the club's newest Japanese signing Ryuji Sueoka in the 2nd and 75th minute while former midfielder and captain of the side, Beto scored the equalizer for Churchill Brothers in the 47th minute. Dempo then won their second match of the season on 12 October 2012 against Sporting Clube de Goa in a huge 5–0 victory with Anthony Pereira scoring early in the 15th minute before Ryuji Sueoka scoring his third goal of the season in the 22nd minute, then Clifford Miranda got his I-League goalscoring campaign to a good start with two goals in the 69th and 74th minutes of the match and Nigerian Koko Sakibo finished the match off in the 93rd minute with a goal from the penalty spot. Dempo then finished their first month of the I-League with their first away victory of the season on 28 October 2012 when they defeated promoted newcomers United Sikkim F.C. 2–1 with Koko Sakibo scoring the first goal of the match in the 20th minute before Salau Nuruddin scored the equalizer in the 59th minute and Ryuji Sueoka scored the winner from the penalty spot in the 93rd minute.

Dempo then started the month of November with a Federation Cup Final rematch against East Bengal F.C. on 3 November 2012 at the Salt Lake Stadium in Kolkata, West Bengal with the score ending in a draw again after 90 minutes with Chidi Edeh giving East Bengal the lead in the 31st minute from the penalty spot before Dempo scored the equalizer from Peter Carvalho in the 82nd minute. Dempo however then went back to winning ways with a resounding 4–1 victory over Shillong Lajong F.C. at the Fatorda Stadium on 10 November 2012 with Ryuji Sueoka scoring 2 minutes into stoppage time of the first half while Clifford Miranda added to the score in the 50th minute before Jibon Singh brought a goal back for Shillong Lajong but a Ryuji Sueoka penalty goal in the 91st minute and Anthony Pereira goal in the 98th minute confirmed Dempo's huge win. Dempo then however suffered a huge set-back when they surprisingly lost to newly promoted ONGC F.C. at the Ambedkar Stadium in Delhi 3–1 with Creson Antao scoring the only goal for Dempo in the 61st minute. Dempo though managed to come back in their next match against Air India FC at the Fatorda Stadium with a 1–0 victory after Joaquim Abranches scored late in the 90th minute to get the victory for the Whites. Dempo then ended the month with a victory over Mohun Bagan A.C. at the Fatorda Stadium by a score of 3–0 with Joaquim Abranches scoring in the 40th minute before Ryuji Sueoka scored in the 45th minute from the spot and Godwin Franco finished the game off in the 70th minute with a striker from yards out. However the result of this match was cancelled as Mohun Bagan were banned from the I-League for 2 years.

The club then began the month of December with a victory against Salgaocar F.C. on 1 December 2012 after summer signing, Englishmen Rohan Ricketts, scored in the 29th minute for Dempo before Sean Rooney scored the equalizer in the 59th minute and Ryuji Sueoka scored the winner in the 84th minute. Dempo then almost suffered a scare in their last match against Prayag United S.C. when they went down after 21 minutes with former striker Ranti Martins scoring for Prayag but Dempo came back with three goals from Ryuji Sueoka, Peter Carvalho, and Climax Lawrence in the 36th, 77th, and 78th minutes respectively. The club though however suffered their second loss of the season when they lost 5–1 to Pune F.C. at the Fatorda Stadium with Joaquim Abranches scoring the only goal for Dempo in the 23rd minute. Despite the loss though Dempo came back in their next match against Pailan Arrows on 22 December 2012 at the Salt Lake Stadium with a 2–1 victory due to a brace from Joaquim Abranches in the 10th and 59th minutes of the match while Milan Singh scored for Pailan Arrows. The club then ended the month of December and the year 2012 with a draw against Mumbai F.C. at the Balewadi Sports Complex on 30 December 2012.

The club then began the new year and January against Prayag United on 4 January 2013 at the Kalyani Stadium in West Bengal in which the club lost 1–0 thanks to a 90th minute free-kick goal from Costa Rican international Carlos Hernández. Dempo then continued what was by their standards a very weak game after the club drew 0–0 between the relegation contenders, Shillong Lajong, in Shillong on 13 January 2013. However Dempo put those results behind them when they came up with a staggering 7–0 victory against United Sikkim at the Duler Stadium on 19 January 2013 in which Joaquim Abranches scored the opener for Dempo in the 5th minute before Clifford Miranda doubled the lead in the 35th minute and then Koko Sakibo, who ended up with a hat-trick, scored 56th, 59th, and 94th minutes of the match with Clifford Miranda and Joy Ferrao scoring within those goals in the 77th minute and 84th minute. Dempo then ended the month of January with a surprise draw against ONGC at the Duler Stadium in which a 91st-minute goal from Peter Carvalho canceled a 37th-minute goal from ONGC's Jatin Singh to earn Dempo a last grasp 1–1 draw.

The club then entered what would be a relatively short month compared to the other months of the season as they only played two matches in the I-League before the month long break till March. Dempo played their first match of the month on 2 February 2013 against Mumbai at the Duler Stadium in which the club had to score two goals in the final five minutes to draw the match 2–2 after both Evans Quao and David Opara scored for Mumbai in the 40th and 67th minute respectively and Peter Carvalho and Koko Sakibo scoring for Dempo in the 86th and 89th minutes respectively. Dempo then ended the month on a sad note when they fell 2–1 to Air India at the Balewadi Sports Complex on 10 February 2013; Prakash Thorat and Henry Ezeh scored for Air India while new loan signing Johnny Menyongar scored the conciliation for Dempo in the 83rd minute.

Dempo then began the post-break part of the I-League with yet another defeat at home to Sporting Goa by a score of 1–0 due to a 51st minute own goal from Rowilson Rodrigues. The club then succumbed to their third defeat in a row on 28 March 2013 against Pune after giving up goals to Sukhwinder Singh and James Moga. The losing streak then continued three days later when Dempo suffered their fourth defeat in a row against Mohun Bagan at the Kalyani Stadium in which Syed Nabi and Odafe Onyeka Okolie gave Bagan a 2–0 lead before Peter Carvalho scored the only goal for Dempo as the match ended 2–1 to Bagan.

The club however then entered the month of April with their fifth loss in a row after losing 2–0 to developmental side Pailan Arrows at the newly revamped Tilak Maidan Stadium in which goals from Holicharan Narzary and Alwyn George saw the Arrows run away with the victory.

The club then entered the final month of the season with two matches left. Their first match occurred on 4 May 2013 against East Bengal at the Tilak Maidan Stadium in which the club drew the match 2–2 with Joy Ferrao and Johnny Menyongar scoring for the club. The club then finished their season on 12 May 2013 against Salgaocar at home in which the club won 2–1 with goals coming from Ryuji Sueoka and Anthony Pereira.

Position by round

References

Dempo SC seasons
Dempo